Hayley McKelvey (born 11 March 1996) is a Canadian water polo player who is a member of the Canada women's national water polo team. She was part of the team at the 2017 World Aquatics Championships and 2019 Pan American Games. She was part of the team in the women's water polo tournament at the 2020 Summer Olympics.

She played for University of Southern California's women's water polo team.

References

External links 
 McKelvey at swimswam
 north-delta-water-polo-player
 McKelveu at olympics.ca

1996 births
Living people
Canadian female water polo players
USC Trojans women's water polo players
Water polo players at the 2019 Pan American Games
Pan American Games medalists in water polo
Pan American Games silver medalists for Canada
Medalists at the 2019 Pan American Games
People from Delta, British Columbia
Water polo players at the 2020 Summer Olympics
Olympic water polo players of Canada